A Recess in the Holy Roman Empire was the document detailing all the decisions made by an Imperial Diet.

Until 1654, a Diet began, in addition to ceremonial rituals, with the reading of the Imperial Proposition—the agenda predetermined by the Emperor—and ended with the decisions being read by the Emperor and ratified, the Recess.

Since the Perpetual Diet of Regensburg which began in 1663 was never formally concluded, its decisions could not be collected as a Recess. They were therefore issued in the form of so-called Imperial Conclusions (Reichsschlüsse). Ratification of these conclusions was usually carried out by the Emperor's representative in the Reichstag, the Principal Commissioner, in the form of an Imperial Commissioner's decree.

References

 
Government documents